The Provincial Assembly of Maniema is the provincial legislature of Maniema. Hubert Kindanda Kishabongo is the speaker, and Pontien Kisanga is the vice-speaker.

Provincial legislatures of the Democratic Republic of the Congo
Maniema